TL-1238 (Substance 3393) is an extremely potent carbamate acetylcholinesterase inhibitor. It has been shown to be more potent than neostigmine.

See also
Miotine
Neostigmine
T-1123
TL-599

References

Acetylcholinesterase inhibitors
Aromatic carbamates
Quaternary ammonium compounds
Phenol esters
Carbamate nerve agents